Alma De Groen is an Australian feminist playwright, born in New Zealand on 5 September 1941.

Biography
Alma Margaret Mathers, born in Manawatu, grew up in Mangakino, a small township founded to serve a hydro-electric power station in the North Island of New Zealand. Her earliest experience of theatre was being taken, as a high school student, to a New Zealand Players production of Saint Joan, which starred Edith Campion, the mother of Jane Campion, as Saint Joan. This, along with a tiny local library which contained works by Shaw and Wilde, began her interest in theatre.

In 1964 she moved to Australia and through the artist Geoffrey De Groen, whom she married in 1965, Alma De Groen was introduced to the film maker Sandy Harbutt, who read her first play, The Sweatproof Boy. Harbutt persuaded theatre director Brian Syron to read it and a mentorship lasting many years began. Syron was the first Aboriginal Australian to study at RADA and at the legendary Stella Adler Studio in New York. His letters of advice and encouragement, and the opportunity to stay with him in New York, where he took her to see Off-Broadway theatre, were critical to her development as a playwright. (Elizabeth Perkins pg 5)

Career
Her career began in earnest when she was living in Canada with husband Geoffrey, and daughter, Nadine. The Nimrod Theatre in Sydney performed The Sweatproof Boy in 1972, directed by Richard Wherrett, who directed most of her early work. The APG (Australian Performing Group) produced her second play, The Joss Adams Show at The Pram Factory in Melbourne, also in 1972. This play, along with the group-devised Women's Theatre Group's Betty Can Jump, was the first expression of Second Wave feminism in Melbourne theatre. (Denise Varney pg 25)

When she returned to Australia in 1973 she became involved with the Australian National Playwrights' Conference, first as a playwright, and later for many years serving as a dramaturg.

Her best-known work is The Rivers of China, featuring the short story writer Katherine Mansfield, which premiered at the Sydney Theatre Company in 1987. It won the Premier's Award in both NSW and Victoria, and is included by the Australian Society of Authors in its list of Australia's 200 best literary works.

In Belonging: Australian Playwrighting in the 20th Century, critic John McCallum describes The Woman in the Window, featuring the poet Anna Akhmatova, as her masterpiece. He calls it and The Rivers of China "the first great works of serious philosophical science fiction written for the theatre in Australia". The Woman in the Window is included, along with Summer of the Seventeenth Doll from Australia, in Lucy Kerbel's 100 Great Plays for Women.

She was the first playwright to receive the Patrick White Award in 1998.

Her papers are archived at The Australian Defence Force Academy.

Works

Theatre 

 The Sweatproof Boy
 The Joss Adams Show 
 Perfectly All Right 
 The After-Life of Arthur Cravan 
 Chidley 
 Going Home
 Vocations
 The Rivers of China
 The Girl Who Saw Everything
 Wildheart (co-writer and dramaturge with Legs on the Wall)
 The Woman in the Window
 Wicked Sisters

Television 

 Going Home.  Adaptation of stage play, 1980
 Rafferty's Rules. Series episode, "The Women", 1984
 Man of Letters. Adaptation of the novel by Glen Tomasetti, 1984
 Singles. Series episode, "Chris", 1988
 After Marcuse. Original teleplay, 1989

Radio 

 Available Light, 1993
 Invisible Sun, 1994
 The Rivers of China (radio adaptation) 1989
 Stories in the Dark (with Ian Mackenzie) Australian Prix Italia entry, 1996

Awards
 1985 Television Adaptation AWGIE Award for Man of Letters
 1988 NSW Premier's Literary Award for The Rivers of China
 1988 Victorian Premier's Literary Award Louis Esson Prize for Drama for The Rivers of China
 1993 Stage AWGIE Award for The Girl Who Saw Everything
 1998 Patrick White Award

References

The Plays of Alma De Groen - Elizabeth Perkins, Rodopi B.V., Amsterdam - Atlanta, GA, 1994
Post-colonial Drama: Theory, Practice, Politics - Helen Gilbert & Joanne Tompkins, Routledge, London, 1996
Plays of the 70s, Volume 1 - Katharine Brisbane, Currency Press, Sydney, 1998 (2012)
Belonging: Australian Playwriting in the 20th Century - John McCallum, Sydney, Australia, Currency Press, 2009
Radical Visions 1968-2008: The Impact of the Sixties on Australian drama - Denise Varney, Rodopi B.V., Amsterdam - New York, NY, 2011
100 Great plays for Women - Lucy Kerbal, London, Nick Hern Books Ltd, 2013

Footnotes

External links
 Alma De Groen: (author/organisation) | AustLit: Discover Australian Stories
 
 Currency Press - Search

Australian dramatists and playwrights
1941 births
Living people
People from Mangakino
New Zealand artists
Feminist artists
Feminist writers